Çayırbaşı can refer to:

 Çayırbaşı, Bitlis, a village
 Çayırbaşı, Göle, a village
 Çayırbaşı, İspir
 Çayırbaşı Stadium